HIP 78530 b is an object that is either a planet or a brown dwarf in the orbit of the star HIP 78530. It was observed as early as 2000, but the object was not confirmed as one in orbit of the star HIP 78530 until a direct imaging project photographed the star in 2008. The image caught the attention of the project's science team, so the team followed up on its initial observations. HIP 78530 b orbits a young, hot, bright blue star in the Upper Scorpius association. The planet itself is over twenty-three times more massive than Jupiter, orbiting eighteen times further from its host star than Pluto does from the Sun by the estimates published in its discovery paper. In this predicted orbit, HIP 78530 b completes an orbit every twelve thousand years.

Discovery

Between 2000 and 2001, the ADONIS system at the ESO 3.6 m Telescope in Chile detected a faint object in the vicinity of HIP 78530. This object was reported in 2005 and 2007, although the astronomers investigating the star were not able to tell, based on their observations, if the faint object was an orbiting companion or not. The team did not follow up on this.

The random selection of ninety-one stars in the Upper Scorpius association provided a sample of stars to be observed using the Near Infrared Imager and Spectrometer (NIRI) and Altitude conjugate Adaptive Optics for the Infrared (ALTAIR) adaptive optics system at the Gemini Observatory. Among the ninety stars selected for direct imaging was the star HIP 78530, which was first imaged by the camera on May 24, 2008. This initial image revealed the presence of the same faint object within the vicinity of HIP 78530.

Follow-up imaging took place on July 2, 2009 and August 30, 2010 using the same instruments, as astronomers hoped to reveal this companion object's proper motion, or the rate that it moves over time. Additional follow-up data was recovered in the spring and summer of 2010, but large errors in the data's astrometry led the investigating astronomers to disregard it. The observations over the three years was compiled, with the data used to filter out pixelated portions of the images and improve the images' quality. The result suggested not only that the faint object in the image was nearby the star HIP 78530, but that it was a brown dwarf or planet in size. Further study would be needed to prove its true nature.

On July 2, 2009, July 3, 2009, and August 8, 2009, use of the NIFS integral field spectrograph with ALTAIR allowed the astronomers to collect data on the spectrum of the faint object and its star. Analysis of the spectra and the objects' astrometry (how the star and the faint object change position in the sky) led to the confirmation of the companion HIP 78530 b.

The confirmation of HIP 78530 b was reported on January 24, 2011. In imaging the ninety-one stars, HIP 78530 b and 1RXSJ1609-2105b were discovered. The discoveries of these two orbiting bodies allowed astronomers to predict that bodies with such low planet/brown dwarf-to-star mass ratios (below 0.01) orbiting at a distance of hundreds of AU exists in the orbits of 2.2% of all stars. However, this number is a lower limit, as astronomers have been unable to detect smaller, low-mass planets that fit this scenario.

Host star

HIP 78530 is a bright, blue B-type main sequence star in the Upper Scorpius association, a loose star cluster composed of stars with a common origin. The star is estimated to be approximately 2.5 times the mass of the Sun. Ages of the Upper Scorpius group have been quoted at 5 million years, however a more recent estimate suggests that the group is somewhat older (approximately 11 million years old). Its effective temperature is estimated at 10500 K, less than twice the effective temperature of the Sun.

HIP 78530 has an apparent magnitude of 7.18. It is incredibly faint, if visible at all, as seen from the unaided eye of an observer on Earth.

Characteristics
HIP 78530 b is most likely a brown dwarf, a massive object that is large enough to fuse deuterium (something that planets are too small to do) but not large enough to ignite and become a star. Because HIP 78530 b's characteristics blend the line between whether or not it is a brown dwarf or a planet, astronomers have tried to determine what HIP 78530 b is by predicting whether it was created in a planet-like or star-like (how brown dwarves are formed) manner.

Its estimated mass is over 23.04 times that of Jupiter. Additionally, HIP 78530 b orbits its host star at an estimated average distance of 710 AU, which is 710 times the average distance between the Earth and the Sun assuming the brown dwarf has a circular orbit. The average distance between dwarf planet Pluto and the Sun is 39.482 AU, meaning that HIP 78530 b orbits its host star nearly eighteen times further than Pluto orbits the Sun. In accordance with the data, HIP 78530 b would complete an orbit approximately every 12,000 years, although the actual orbital motion of HIP 78530 b is most likely smaller than 710 AU, but it has not been directly observed long enough to know definitively.

References

Exoplanets discovered in 2011
Scorpius (constellation)
Exoplanets detected by direct imaging
Upper Scorpius